Barry Daniels (1933–2010) was a British artist, painter, and designer.

Barry Daniels studied at Slade School of Fine Arts in the 1950s with lucien Freud, Henry Moore, graham Sutherland, Phillip Sutton, Paula Rego, Euan Uglow, Michael Andrews and Bernard Cohen, taught by William Coldstream

He won the Wilson Steer prize for Landscape painting in 1953, the Abbey Minor Scholarship 53, Boise Scholarship 54 and French Government Scholarship 58.

Barry Exhibited at the ICA Six Young Painters and London Group Exhibitions in 1956. In 1959 he exhibited in a major abstract Impressionism exhibition along with  Nicolas de Staël, Sam Francis, Peter Lanyon, Patrick Heron, Bernard Cohen, André Masson and Helen Frankenthaler. Rowland & Delbance Group Shows 1956-58 and Fulham Gallery in 1968.

In 1958 he and Tom Adams started Danad Design, a collective formed with three other artists - Peter Blake, Bernard Cohen, Robyn Denny and Edward Wright. They had one major exhibition in the Portal Gallery in November 1960. Danad Design furniture was sold exclusively through London outlets Liberty's, Heals and Harrods.

Toward the end of the 1960s Barry Daniels started designing for textiles and set up the Barry Daniels Studio. As well as selling his own designs he became an agent for designers from the 70's, 80's and 90's, selling globally but mostly in New York.

References

1933 births
2010 deaths
British artists